Horatio Caine is a fictional character and the protagonist of the American crime drama CSI: Miami, portrayed by David Caruso from 2002 to 2012. He is the head of the crime lab, under the rank of Lieutenant of the Miami-Dade Police Department (MDPD).

Fictional character biography

Horatio Caine formerly worked in New York City as a detective with the NYPD, much like Caruso's NYPD Blue character Det. John Kelly, before moving to Miami. In 1995 he was stabbed while investigating a case in which children were locked in closets while their parents were murdered. The perpetrator, Walter Resden, harbored a grudge against Horatio, collecting the blood from the stabbing and preserving it for 10 years in order to frame him for the murder of Horatio's girlfriend, Rachel Turner.

After his arrival in Florida, Horatio joined the Miami-Dade Police as a homicide detective but later transferred to the bomb squad, where he was mentored by Al Humphries, an older cop whom Horatio respected and considered a good friend. Humphries was killed after accidentally triggering a bomb he was attempting to disarm.

Horatio worked undercover as "John Walden" in Pensacola, Florida for some time during the early 1990s. During his time there, he dated a woman he believed to be named Julia Eberlie, and the two conceived a son named Kyle. Horatio was not aware of Kyle's existence for another 16 years. Sometime later he returned to Miami to be a detective.  In the episode "Out of Time" he references previously working on the bomb squad.

Finally, Horatio moved to the crime lab, accepting a promotion to lieutenant, which earned him the animosity of Sergeant Rick Stetler, who was also vying for the position. When veteran CSI Megan Donner went on personal leave following the death of her husband, Horatio became the permanent head of the lab.

In early seasons, Horatio frequently confirms his dedication to the job with the catchphrase "We Never Close", an homage to the Pinkerton Agency.  Horatio is known for wearing sunglasses (known by fans as the 'Shades of Justice'); one of his trademarks is to put them on prior to making a dramatic remark.  In season 8, it is revealed that this style of sunglasses were originally a gift from Eric Delko in 1997.

In season 4, Horatio began a romantic relationship with Marisol Delko (Eric's sister).  Horatio and Marisol got married and she was killed by the end of season 4.

In the season nine finale, Horatio is shot down by Randy North, the unwilling accomplice of convicted felon Jack Toller, who also kidnaps Horatio's co-worker Natalia Boa Vista and puts her in the trunk of a car and pushes it off the pier.  In the tenth-season premiere, Horatio manages to save Natalia and, with the team, captures Toller.

Head of the day shift crime lab

In the CSI continuum, Horatio is a day shift supervisor at the Miami-Dade crime lab, a forensic analyst and former homicide detective and bomb squad officer (his forensic specialty is arson and explosion evidence). He is very protective of his team, who affectionately call him "H". He is very concerned about the reputation of his lab, and takes great care to keep them clean, likely because of his experience with his tarnished younger brother, Ray. When his staff fall under suspicion in several episodes ("One of Our Own", "Internal Affairs"), he immediately jumps in their defense, especially from IA investigator Rick Stetler, and tries his best to prove their innocence.

Unlike his counterpart in Las Vegas, now former CSI Supervisor Gil Grissom (CSI: Crime Scene Investigation), he is a sworn police officer, and thus carries a badge and gun. A superb marksman, Horatio doesn't hesitate to use deadly force when the situation calls for it. He is also an ardent advocate of the death penalty for particularly heinous crimes, and doesn't think twice about threatening suspects with it in such cases. He is also known to reserve an especially deep wrath for those who would dare to harm children. Horatio is truly egalitarian, treating all victims and their families equally, regardless of their ethnicity, background, or economic station. He often goes out of his way to ensure they are alright during the course of a case, especially when it involves a child, frequently giving his number to them, stating that he is available day or night to take their call. On top of providing himself with a comfortable living, Horatio has helped others financially with such expensive things as providing private funeral arrangements for an indigent murder victim, rent and living expenses for his brother Ray's mistress and his niece, as well as medical costs for his niece's cancer treatment, purchasing an apartment for his son Kyle, despite being a civil servant on a county wage. This is likely due to a number of extremely shrewd financial decisions and deals Horatio made over the years leading up to the series.

Past events
In the first two seasons, Horatio carries a Beretta Cougar on the job. Since the beginning of season three, he has been shown carrying a SIG Sauer P229. He is very insistent on gun maintenance, especially since team member Tim Speedle was killed in a shootout after his gun misfired because of his lax maintenance. In fact, one of the reasons for Horatio's nearly on-the-spot selection of Officer Ryan Wolfe as Tim Speedle's replacement (in episode 303, "Under the Influence") is Wolfe's compulsive care of his firearm due to OCD.

He is later forced to fire Wolfe, as the younger CSI compromised himself during the course of the investigation due to his gambling debts and lack of honesty regarding the situation (episode 522, "Burned"). Wolfe also previously violated protocol. Horatio indicates a willingness to allow Wolfe to redeem himself, however, and possibly allow him to return to the team after reviewing all the files from his previous cases (episode 523, "Kill Switch").

At the end of Season 2 (episode 223, "MIA/NYC — Nonstop"), Horatio travels to New York City in pursuit of a murder suspect and meets Detective Mac Taylor and his team, inaugurating the first season of CSI: NY. Horatio later reunites with Mac and the New York CSIs to track down and arrest the murderer, Henry Darius, who would be extradited to Florida to face the death penalty (CSI: Miami episode 407, "Felony Flight," CSI: NY episode 207, "Manhattan Manhunt").  This appearance would make Horatio Caine the first character to appear at least once in all three CSI shows.

He has many recurring enemies throughout the series, from serial killer Walter Resden to abusive internal affairs agent Rick Stetler to corrupt judge Joseph Ratner. Some he thought had been put away for good come back to haunt him. Clavo Cruz, serving a life sentence for murdering a woman (episode 201, "Blood Brothers," episode 315, "Identity"), escapes custody in a dramatic rocket attack on a courthouse (superficially injuring coroner Alexx Woods). Cruz then kidnaps a court stenographer and forces Horatio to bring him $1 million in exchange for her location. It is all a set-up, however, and Horatio and Delko are ambushed on the roof of a parking garage. Though Horatio shoots down one man and escapes without injury, Delko is critically wounded even as Horatio fires at the fleeing gunmen (episode 514, "No Man's Land"). Horatio eventually forces Cruz out of hiding by removing all his avenues of escape. Cruz approaches Horatio outside the Miami-Dade Crime Lab, and Horatio kills Clavo with a single shot to the chest (episode 515, "Man Down").

In episode 302 ("Pro Per"), Yelina's house was shot but she and Ray Jr. were unharmed because previously Horatio had warned of them. The attackers were captured and although the danger had passed, Horatio offered her to stay out all night watching the house but Yelina said him that it wasn't necessary. In that moment, to Horatio's surprise, Rick Stetler leaves the house with Ray Jr.  Horatio was deeply disappointed.

In episode 406 ("Under Suspicion"), Rachel Turner, Horatio's girlfriend, is murdered. He is suspected of the murder because he was the last person to see the victim alive. Later, the true killer was found, he was Walter Resden, an old enemy of Horatio.

In the episode 412 ("The Score"), Marisol Delko invited Horatio to have dinner but he refused at first, because she had just been cleared in a drug investigation and he, as head of the lab, could be put under scrutinity. He ended up accepting the invitation, and the two later started their relationship.

Horatio finds himself targeted by the son of Argento, a crime lord whom he helped put in jail some years earlier. After the young man vandalizes Horatio's vehicle, then smugly denies culpability; he then shoots the Lieutenant. However, the rounds from his gun were replaced with blanks, Horatio leaves without injury and the son is arrested afterward (episode 602, "Cyber-lebrity").

In the episode "Bone Voyage", when Raymond Langston comes to help Horatio and his team, he mentions deceased CSI Warrick Brown and asks Langston to tell Catherine Willows that he is sorry for their loss.

Recent events
In the end of the Season 8 finale, Horatio receives a shocking message from the man he arrested. The message said: "THEY ALL FALL DOWN". In the Season 9 premiere, he rushes to the crime lab, fearing for the team's lives. When he got out of the elevator, he finds everyone down and Eric barely conscious. Eric tells him to shoot the windows out for oxygen. After Horatio does so, everyone gets back to their feet, except for Jesse Cardoza, who dies from his fall to the floor. Horatio then tries to comfort the devastated Natalia, who unsuccessfully attempted to revive Cardoza. Horatio finds the killer, and then joins the team on a game of basketball, in honor of Cardoza.

In "See No Evil" a large prison break occurs and one of the inmates, Joe LeBrock, states that they were planning on targeting Horatio.

In the episode "Manhunt", he and the team track down Memmo Fierro, the man who was serving time for killing Marisol (Horatio's wife and Eric's sister) after he is one of the eight people who broke out in the previous episode. Memmo (under orders of Antonio Riaz of the Mala Noche) had shot Marisol, then blocked the ambulance, trying to get Horatio to come out, forcing the ambulance to drive over a center median. At the hospital, a doctor states that the car was worse than the bullet. Both the shooting and the blocking proved fatal to Marisol. At the end of the episode, Memmo takes a hostage, his daughter's social worker. Eric has a clear shot of him, but Horatio tells him not to shoot him in front of Memmo's daughter. After Memmo sees his daughter, he leaves with the hostage, who is later found dead.

In "Happy Birthday", Horatio is seen driving at the beginning of the episode with a bouquet of flowers on the passenger seat and leaves Eric a message on his phone asking him to take over from him for a while so he can run an errand. He is distracted by a pedestrian, who informs him a pregnant woman has been assaulted on the side of the road. Leaving his errand behind, he helps the woman and spends the rest of the episode looking for the people who did this to her, while the mother and the baby are fighting for their life back in the hospital. At the end of the episode, the mother gives birth to a baby girl, and her husband is arrested because he did not want her to have the baby and rigged the car to so that she would hit the steering wheel in her midsection during a staged car accident & force a miscarriage. We see Horatio at Marisol's grave; he tells her the baby is "beautiful, just like you". He then wishes her 'happy birthday'. Marisol's murder caused him a big feeling of guilt because he couldn't protect her and that idea obsessed him a long time after her death.

In "Last Stand", Memmo returns with a gang of drug cartels, and Horatio lays a trap for him, alone. Horatio kicks Memmo multiple times and holds him at gunpoint. Memmo states to him that killing his wife was not personal, but Horatio responds that it was to him. Memmo asks if what Caine is doing is "righteous" and if he is at peace with his decision. Horatio responds that he is, and places him under arrest, and waits for backup to arrive.

In "Crowned", Horatio does not help a kidnapper, who kidnapped a girl who participated in a child's beauty pageants, and lets him fall off the edge at an abandoned movie theater, after shooting him (not fatally).

Over recent years and presumably due to the fact that he was left gravely injured after being shot, Horatio has become more aggressive than usual when it comes to dealing with suspects and he has been seen on at least two occasions apparently assaulting a suspect in a locked room (the actual assault is only implied as it takes place off camera). In both these cases the suspect was accused of abuse (one child molestation, the other domestic violence).

Further evidence of this can be found in the season 8 episode "Kill Clause", the ending of which implies that Horatio has sanctioned the murder of a corrupt CEO who had his employees murdered for their life insurance.

Reception

Caruso's performance as Horatio Caine received very positive feedback from critics. The Character became one of few fan favorite characters in the CSI franchise. On an episode of the Late Show with David Letterman that aired on March 8, 2007, comedian Jim Carrey professed to being a fan of the show and went on to satirically impersonate Caruso's character, which received praise from Caruso.

References

Crossover characters in television
CSI: Miami characters
Fictional criminologists
Fictional forensic scientists
Fictional medical examiners
Fictional Irish American people
Fictional Miami-Dade Police Department detectives
Fictional New York City Police Department detectives
Fictional police lieutenants
Orphan characters in television
Television characters introduced in 2002